Eupithecia kudoi is a moth in the family Geometridae. It is found in Taiwan and Vietnam.

References

Moths described in 1983
kudoi
Moths of Asia